WorldWIT was a global online discussion community for women in business and technology.

It was founded in 1999 as ChicWIT, in Chicago. ChicWIT was followed by MassWIT in Boston, NycWIT in New York City, and CapitolWIT in Washington, D.C. In October 2005 there were over 80 WorldWIT chapters in operation and over 40,000 members. Women (and a few men) used the daily WorldWIT newsletter to share business, technical, career, health, financial and life advice with one another.

WorldWIT was recognized in October 2004 as the Women's Business Organization of the Year, by the Stevie Awards Organization.

In March 2007, WorldWIT and its local city chapters were shut down.  This was the announcement:

WorldWIT used L-Soft list serv technology and a robust website as the basis of its social networking platform.  Bill Phillips designed and managed both the listserv and website.  L-Soft published an online article featuring WorldWIT in 2005.  See http://www.lsoft.com/news/qa-issue2-2005-eu.asp

External links
 worldwit.org domain no longer exists
 See https://web.archive.org/web/*/worldwit.org for a cached archive of WorldWIT's website.  
 See http://www.w3w3.com/WorldWIT-Radio/ for WorldWIT radio show.

American social networking websites
Organizations for women in science and technology
Internet properties established in 1999
Women's organizations based in the United States
1999 establishments in Illinois